Oquaga Creek State Park is a  state park in Broome, Delaware, and Chenango counties, New York. The park is partially in the Town of Masonville and partly in the Town of Sanford. Broome County Road 241 passes through the park.

Park description

Oquaga Creek State Park has 90 campsites, one full-service cottage, and several "rustic" cabins. A limited number of seasonal campsites are also available. Many of the campsites are lined with raspberry bushes and wild strawberries.

In the winter, the lake is used for ice fishing and skating.

The park was closed for camping during the 2010 season due to New York State's budget shortfalls, however the park's campground re-opened in summer 2011.

The park also includes a nine-hole disc golf course, built in 1979.

See also
 List of New York state parks

References

External links
 New York State Parks: Oquaga Creek State Park

State parks of New York (state)
Parks in Broome County, New York
Parks in Delaware County, New York
Parks in Chenango County, New York